Ottorino is an Italian male given name. It may refer to:

Ottorino Pietro Alberti (1927–2012), Italian Roman Catholic archbishop
Ottorino Barassi (1898–1971), Italian sports official
Ottorino Celli (1890–?), Italian cyclist
Ottorino Enzo (1926–2012), Italian rower
Ottorino Flaborea (born 1940), Italian former basketball player and coach
Ottorino Gentiloni (1865–1916), Italian politician
Ottorino Mezzalama (1888–1931), Italian mountain climber
Ottorino Piotti (born 1954), Italian former footballer
Ottorino Quaglierini (1915–1992), Italian rower
Ottorino Respighi (1879–1936), Italian composer, musicologist and conductor
Ottorino Sartor (1945–2021), Peruvian football goalkeeper
Ottorino Volonterio (1917–2003), Swiss racing driver